Moonbase 8 is an American comedy television series created and written by Fred Armisen, Tim Heidecker, Jonathan Krisel and John C. Reilly, starring Armisen, Heidecker and Reilly in the lead roles. It premiered on November 8, 2020, on Showtime.

Premise
Moonbase 8 follows three subpar astronauts in one of several NASA Moon base training simulators located in Winslow, Arizona, hoping to be the crew selected by NASA to travel to the actual Moon Base, whose construction is nearing completion.

Cast

Main
 John C. Reilly as Robert "Cap" Caputo, a former helicopter tour pilot who claims to be a military veteran
 Tim Heidecker as Professor Scott "Rook" Sloan, a Christian who wants to spread "the Gospel of Jesus Christ out into the universe"
 Fred Armisen as Dr. Michael "Skip" Henai, the son of an astronaut

Guest
 Travis Kelce as himself, a piece of "stunt casting" by NASA for the astronaut program
 Adam Lambert as Billy
 Thomas Mann as Cooper
 Alia Shawkat as Alix

Episodes

Production

Development
On April 24, 2018, it was announced that A24 had begun production on a comedy television series titled Moonbase 8 that they independently funded. Executive producers include Fred Armisen, Tim Heidecker, Jonathan Krisel, John C. Reilly, and Dave Kneebone. Krisel directed all six episodes. Production companies involved with the production include A24 and Abso Lutely Productions. A24 began shopping the series to networks once production concluded. The series premiered on November 8, 2020, on Showtime. The entire first season became available on-demand to Showtime subscribers on November 8, 2020.

The series is scored by Steven Drozd of The Flaming Lips, his first time scoring a project.

Casting
Alongside the series announcement, it was confirmed that Armisen, Heidecker, and Reilly would star in the series.

Reception
Reviews of the series have been mixed. On Rotten Tomatoes, the series holds an approval rating of 57% based on 23 reviews, with an average rating of 6.16/10. The website's critics consensus reads, "Despite a talented central trio and a few great moments, Moonbase 8s portrait of monotonous mediocrity may be too low-key for some viewers to achieve comedic lift off—though that may be exactly the point." On Metacritic, it has a weighted average score of 61 out of 100 based on 18 reviews, indicating "generally favorable reviews".

In reviewing the series in contrast to the other "work-space" comedies of 2020, Avenue 5 and Space Force, Danette Chavez of The A.V. Club stated that Moonbase 8 has the most potential to continue as a comedy on its own merits, beyond the stunt of the space setting. Ben Travers of IndieWire praised the show while saying it still has room to grow, writing "there’s room for creative expansion in future seasons, but this is a small-scale mission that’s off to a solid start".

References

External links
 Moonbase 8 on A24
 

2020s American comedy television series
2020 American television series debuts
English-language television shows
Showtime (TV network) original programming
Television series by A24
Television series by Abso Lutely Productions
Television series about the Moon
Television series about NASA
Television shows set in Arizona